1859 in philosophy

Events

Publications 
 John Stuart Mill, On Liberty (1859)
 Charles Darwin, On the Origin of Species (1859) [Note: On the Origin of Species is not a philosophical text per se, but is nevertheless listed here for its enormous influence on philosophical thought.]

Births 
 January 13 - Kostis Palamas (died 1943)
 April 8 - Edmund Husserl (died 1938) 
 October 18 - Henri Bergson (died 1941)
 October 20 - John Dewey (died 1952)

Deaths 
 April 16 - Alexis de Tocqueville (born 1805)
 May 6 - Alexander von Humboldt (born 1769)

References 

Philosophy
19th-century philosophy
Philosophy by year